Written is a 2007 South Korean drama thriller film produced, written, directed and edited by Kim Byung-woo. It stars Lee Jin-seok, Kim Bo-young, Lee Sang-hyuk and Park Jin-soo. It made its world premiere at the 2007 Busan International Film Festival.

Plot
A (Lee Jin-seok) wakes up in a bathtub to find his kidney missing. As he struggles to understand what has happened and searches for his kidney, he finds out that he is just a character in a script and an actor (Lee Sang-hyuk) is playing his character. While the film crew is shooting and the script still unfinished, will A find a way out of his hellish predicament?

Cast
Lee Jin-seok as Character A
Kim Bo-young as Writer
Lee Sang-hyuk as Actor A
Park Jin-soo as Director

Production
Written is a film within a film, was shot on high-definition video and cost Kim US$15,000 to make. He self-funded the project through selling his things and doing part-time jobs.

Awards and nominations

References

External links
 

2007 films
2007 action thriller films
South Korean action thriller films
Films directed by Kim Byung-woo
2000s South Korean films